Windir ("Warrior" in English) was a black metal band from Sogndal, Norway. The band was formed in 1994 by vocalist and multi-instrumentalist Terje "Valfar" Bakken, and released its debut album Sóknardalr in 1997. Windir combined black metal with Scandinavian folk music, folklore and mythology, and many of the band's lyrics are written in Sognamål. Windir produced four albums in their almost ten years of existence. The band broke up in March 2004 after frontman Valfar died of hypothermia after becoming caught in a blizzard on his way to his family's cabin in Norway. Following his death, the remaining band members went on to form a number of new bands including Vreid, Mistur, and Cor Scorpii.

Most of the band's early albums featured lyrics written in frontman Valfar's native dialect, Sognamål. The band had an "intense affinity for traditional music and Norwegian texts, drawing much of its lyrical content from local sagas, using traditional folk tunes in its music, and singing in an archaic rural dialect." With the coining of the term, the genre "Sognametal" as established by Windir has inspired many bands from the small region of Sogn og Fjordane, most of whom are ex-members of Windir or friends of them. These bands include: Vreid, Cor Scorpii, Mistur, Sigtyr and Feigd.

Valfar's death
On January 14, 2004, Terje "Valfar" Bakken went to his family's cabin at Fagereggi, Norway, by foot. On January 17, his body was found at Reppastølen in the Sogndal valley. He died from hypothermia after being surprised by sudden inclement weather en route. He was buried on January 27 at Stedje Church in Norway. In March 2004, Windir officially disbanded.

A compilation album containing Windir outtakes and B-sides, Valfar, ein Windir, was released in 2004 as a tribute to Valfar. On September 3, 2004, in Oslo, Windir's remaining members performed their last concert to go back to their roots and keep base with what they thought was real. Enslaved, Finntroll, Notodden All Stars, Weh, E-Head and Mindgrinder were the guest bands.

Band members

Final line-up
Terje "Valfar" Bakken – vocals, guitars, bass, keyboards, accordion (1994-2004, instruments are studio-only since 2001)
Jørn "Steingrim" Holen – drums (1994-2004, studio-only until 2001)
Jarle "Hvàll" Kvåle – bass guitar (2001-2004)
Sture Dingsøyr – rhythm guitar (2001-2004), vocals (2004)
Stian "Strom" Bakketeig – lead guitar (2001-2004)
Gaute "Righ" Refsnes – keyboards  (2001-2004)

Past members
Sorg – guitars (1994 - 1996) and choir (on Det gamle riket)
Lars Stian "Invictus" Havraas - bass (session)

Session members

Arntor
Steinarson - clean vocals
I. R. Aroy - lead guitar (tracks 2, 4 and 6)
Harjar - lead guitar (tracks 3 and 5)
B. T. Aroy - keys (track 7)

Other session members
Cosmocrator - clean vocals (on 1184, Likferd and on Sognametal)
Vegard Bakken - vocals (on Sognametal)

Discography

Albums
Sóknardalr (1997)
Arntor (1999)
1184 (2001)
Likferd (2003)

Compilations
Valfar, ein Windir (2004, a tribute to deceased founding member Valfar)

Videos
 Sognametal (DVD, 2005)

Demo albums
The demos feature Valfar on vocals, Sorg on guitars, and Steingrim on drums.
Sogneriket (1994)
Det gamle riket (1995)

References

External links
Official website
Biography
Metal Archives File

Norwegian black metal musical groups
Norwegian folk metal musical groups
Norwegian viking metal musical groups
Musical groups established in 1994
1994 establishments in Norway
Musical groups disestablished in 2004
2004 disestablishments in Norway
Musical groups from Sogn og Fjordane
Musicians from Sogndal